The 1958 Torneo Godó was the sixth edition of the Torneo Godó annual tennis tournament played on clay courts in Barcelona, Spain and it took place from May 12–18, 1958.

Seeds

Draw

Finals

External links
 ITF – Tournament details
 Official tournament website
 ATP tournament profile

Barcelona Open (tennis)
Godo
Spain